Gibson/Miller Band was an American country music band founded in 1990 by Dave Gibson and Bill "Blue" Miller, the latter of whom was a former guest musician in rock musician Bob Seger's Silver Bullet Band. Both Gibson and Miller served as vocalists and guitarists in the Gibson/Miller Band, which also included Mike Daly (steel guitar), Bryan Grassmeyer (bass guitar), and Steve Grossman (drums). Grassmeyer was replaced in 1993 by Doug Kahan. Between 1992 and 1994, the Gibson/Miller Band recorded two albums for Epic Records, in addition to charting seven singles on the Billboard Hot Country Singles & Tracks charts. After disbanding in 1994, both Gibson and Miller assumed solo careers.

Biography
Gibson/Miller Band was formed in 1990, when Doug Johnson, then-vice president of Epic Records, introduced Dave Gibson and Blue Miller to each other, thinking that the two artists would work well together as songwriters. Among Gibson's cuts were "If It Don't Come Easy" by Tanya Tucker, "Ships That Don't Come In" by Joe Diffie and "Queen of Memphis" by Confederate Railroad. Gibson and Miller soon assembled a band and recorded a demo tape, which they sent to Johnson. By 1992, the band was signed to Epic Records; their debut single, "Big Heart", was released at the end of the year.

In 1993, the group's first album, titled Where There's Smoke, was released. Counting "Big Heart", the album produced five chart singles overall, including the No. 20 "High Rollin'", their highest-charting. The Gibson/Miller Band also received the Academy of Country Music's award for Top New Vocal Duo or Group, beating Blackhawk and Boy Howdy.

A second album, Red, White & Blue Collar, was released in 1994. Serving as its lead-off single was a cover of Waylon Jennings and Willie Nelson's "Mammas Don't Let Your Babies Grow Up to Be Cowboys"; Gibson/Miller Band's version was also featured in the soundtrack for the 1994 film The Cowboy Way. Red, White & Blue Collar was less successful than its predecessor, however, and the Gibson/Miller Band was dropped from Epic's roster that same year, shortly before disbanding. Both Gibson and Miller continued to record solo, and as backing musicians for other artists. In 1997, Gibson married singer-songwriter Daisy Dern.

Discography

Albums

Singles

Music videos

Awards
Academy of Country Music
 1993 Top New Vocal Group or Duet

References

Country music groups from Georgia (U.S. state)
American country rock groups
Musical groups established in 1990
Musical groups disestablished in 1994
Epic Records artists